The Park Theatre (or Park Center) is a regional performing arts center in Hayward, Wisconsin, offering a variety of musical and artistic performances. The theatre is operated under the direction of the Cable Hayward Area Arts Council (CHARAC), a Nonprofit organization formed in 1996 to bring together the art, artists and supporters of art in the area.

The theater was built in 1948, in what was known as Whitten Park. The first movie shown at the Park was Romance on the High Seas. The architecture and decor is decorative modernism. The Park Theatre has always been a movie theater, but was reorganized as a performing arts center in 2007.

The theatre has a state of the art digital audio board, with live recording capabilities. The high-end sound system provides quality sound for live events, as well as high quality live 32-track recording capabilities for the artists.

Some of the notable artists to perform at the Park include Randy Sabien, Charlie Parr and Michael Gulezian.

References

External links

 Official Site
 Secondary Website

Theatres in Wisconsin
Theatres completed in 1948
Event venues established in 1948
Cinemas and movie theaters in Wisconsin
Performing arts centers in Wisconsin
Music venues in Wisconsin
1948 establishments in Wisconsin